The 7th National Congress of the Chinese Communist Party was convened April 23 - June 11, 1945, in Yan'an.  It was held in Shaanxi, not in Beijing, the Capital, as it was not yet safe during the Second Sino-Japanese War.  The Republic of China still had nominal control. It set in motion the 7th Central Committee of the Chinese Communist Party.  At this time, there was a coalition government between the Kuomintang and Communist parties, because they both respectively had their headquarters within different regions of China.  It was preceded by the 6th National Congress and followed by the 8th National Congress.

References

External links
 Resolution on certain Questions in the history of the Party

1945 conferences
1945 in China
National Congress of the Chinese Communist Party